Dogana is a largest town of San Marino.

Dogana may also refer to:

Dogana (crater), a crater on Mars
Dogana, Civitella Paganico, a village in Tuscany
Dogana, Afghanistan, a village in Afghanistan; near Tapa, Afghanistan
Dogana da Mar, a 17th-century counting house in Venice, Italy; now a museum